Upper Yoder Township is a township in Cambria County, Pennsylvania, United States. The population was 5,449 at the 2010 census. It is part of the Johnstown, Pennsylvania Metropolitan Statistical Area.

Geography
It is bordered by Johnstown to the east and the boroughs of Westmont and Southmont to the north. Westmoreland County is on the township's western border, and Somerset County is to the south. The unincorporated community of Elim occupies the eastern end of the township.

Demographics

As of the census of 2000, there were 5,862 people, 2,156 households, and 1,528 families residing in the township.  The population density was 493.6 people per square mile (190.5/km2).  There were 2,275 housing units at an average density of 191.6/sq mi (73.9/km2).  The racial makeup of the township was 98.33% White, 0.67% African American, 0.15% Native American, 0.49% Asian, 0.05% Pacific Islander, 0.07% from other races, and 0.24% from two or more races. Hispanic or Latino of any race were 0.38% of the population.

There were 2,156 households, out of which 26.4% had children under the age of 18 living with them, 61.4% were married couples living together, 6.9% had a female householder with no husband present, and 29.1% were non-families. 26.5% of all households were made up of individuals, and 14.8% had someone living alone who was 65 years of age or older.  The average household size was 2.35 and the average family size was 2.85.

In the township the population was spread out, with 18.4% under the age of 18, 7.2% from 18 to 24, 23.3% from 25 to 44, 24.0% from 45 to 64, and 27.1% who were 65 years of age or older.  The median age was 46 years. For every 100 females, there were 87.6 males.  For every 100 females age 18 and over, there were 83.7 males.

The median income for a household in the township was $41,504, and the median income for a family was $51,415. Males had a median income of $31,344 versus $27,468 for females. The per capita income for the township was $20,053.  About 6.2% of families and 7.3% of the population were below the poverty line, including 7.4% of those under age 18 and 9.8% of those age 65 or over.

References

External links
Upper Yoder Township official website

Populated places established in 1820
1820 establishments in Pennsylvania
Townships in Cambria County, Pennsylvania